Robert Gray (born 5 October 1956) is a Canadian former athlete. He competed in the men's discus throw at the 1984 Summer Olympics.

References

External links
 
 
 
 
 

1956 births
Living people
Athletes (track and field) at the 1978 Commonwealth Games
Athletes (track and field) at the 1984 Summer Olympics
Canadian male discus throwers
Olympic track and field athletes of Canada
Athletes from Toronto
Commonwealth Games medallists in athletics
Athletes (track and field) at the 1982 Commonwealth Games
Commonwealth Games silver medallists for Canada
Commonwealth Games bronze medallists for Canada
Athletes (track and field) at the 1979 Pan American Games
Pan American Games track and field athletes for Canada
World Athletics Championships athletes for Canada
20th-century Canadian people
21st-century Canadian people
Medallists at the 1978 Commonwealth Games
Medallists at the 1982 Commonwealth Games